Georgia Wilson (born 20 May 1996) is an Australian field hockey player. In 2017 she was named to the Australian national team. She has also played for WA Diamonds. Her position is midfield.

Early life and education
Wilson grew up in Mahogany Creek, Western Australia. She began playing hockey at age 4. Wilson studies Human Biology and Marketing at University of Western Australia.

Career

Junior National Team
Wilson first represented Australia at a junior level in 2016 at the Junior Oceania Cup, where the team finished first, securing qualification to the Junior World Cup.

Later that year, Wilson was also selected in the 'Jillaroos' squad for the Junior World Cup. Shortly before the tournament, she tore her hamstring forcing her to withdraw from the competition, and the injury ultimately sidelined her for three and a half months. Following the injury, Wilson participated in a national team training camp.

Senior National Team
In March 2017 Wilson was selected for the 2017 Hockeyroos squad, the Australian national women's field hockey team. Wilson plays the position of midfield. Wilson was part of the Hockeyroos team that secured a place in the 2018 women's field hockey world cup with a fifth place finish at the 2017 World League Semi-Final.

Wilson was part of the WA Diamonds for the 2017 Australian Hockey League. That same year Hockey WA gave her the Rechelle Hawkes Youth Player of the Year award.

References

External links
 
 
 
 

1996 births
Living people
Australian female field hockey players
Field hockey players from Perth, Western Australia
Sportswomen from Western Australia
Field hockey players at the 2020 Summer Olympics
Field hockey players at the 2022 Commonwealth Games
Olympic field hockey players of Australia
20th-century Australian women
21st-century Australian women
Commonwealth Games medallists in field hockey
Commonwealth Games silver medallists for Australia
Medallists at the 2022 Commonwealth Games